Kids Power is a Lebanese children's television show that first aired on 2 September 2003 on  Lebanese Broadcasting Corporation (LBC). Several presenters on the show originally started on Mini Studio, another Children's show until it was cancelled.

References

External links
 https://web.archive.org/web/20160304095309/http://www.lbcgroup.tv/kids-power

Lebanese television series
2000s Lebanese television series
2000s children's television series
Lebanese Broadcasting Corporation International original programming